Germany's Strongest Man is an annual strongman competition held in Germany and featuring exclusively German athletes. Heinz Ollesch holds the record for most wins with 12 wins.

Top 3 placings

References

External links 
Official site

National strongmen competitions
Sports competitions in Germany